The Bayakoa Stakes is a Grade III American Thoroughbred horse race for fillies and mares age three and older run over a distance of  one and one sixteenth miles ( furlongs) on the dirt held annually in early December at Los Alamitos Race Course in Cypress, California. The event currently offers a purse of $100,000.

History

The inaugural running of the race was on 13 December 1981 as the Silver Belles Handicap at Hollywood Park Racetrack in Inglewood, California over a distance of  miles and was won by the imported five-year-old Argentine-bred mare Happy Guess who was ridden by US Hall of Fame jockey Bill Shoemaker in a time of 1:49.

In 1983 the American Graded Stakes Committee classified the event with  Grade III status. In 1986 the race was upgraded once more to Grade II.

In 1990 the distance of the event was decreased to  miles.

The race was renamed the Bayakoa Handicap in 1994 in honor of U.S. Racing Hall of Fame inductee, Bayakoa.

On 7 December 1997, Sharp Cat won the Bayakoa Stakes in the first walkover in the history of Hollywood Park Racetrack.

In 2006 the event was run on a new synthetic Cushion Track which was installed at Hollywood Park.

With the closure of Hollywood Park Racetrack in 2013 the event was moved Los Alamitos Race Course and was run with stakes allowance conditions as the Bayakoa Stakes.

The event was not held in 1987, 2015 and in 2018.

The event was held at Del Mar Racetrack in 2016 with handicap conditions.

In 2019 the event was downgraded to Grade III status.

Records
Speed record: (at current distance of 11/16 miles (8.5 furlongs)
 1:40.38 - Briecat (2008)

Most wins:
 2 - Manistique (1998, 1999)
 2 - Starrer (2001, 2002)
 2 - Star Parade (2003, 2005)

Most wins by a jockey:
 5 - Chris McCarron (1985, 1990, 1991, 1993, 1996)
 5 - Victor Espinoza (2003, 2004, 2006, 2009, 2014)

Most wins by a trainer:
 5 - John Shirreffs (1998, 1999, 2002, 2004, 2009)

Most wins by an owner:
 3 - George Krikorian (2001, 2002, 2004)

Winners

Legend:

See also
 List of American and Canadian Graded races

References

Graded stakes races in the United States
Grade 3 stakes races in the United States
Mile category horse races for fillies and mares
Horse races in California
Recurring sporting events established in 1981
1981 establishments in California
Los Alamitos, California